Lieutenant John Knox MacArthur (14 January 1891 – 9 August 1918) was an American World War I flying ace credited with six aerial victories. He was his squadron's first ace.

Biography
MacArthur was an electrical engineer before he joined the U.S. Army Air Force.

MacArthur downed his half dozen Germany planes from 13 June through 19 July 1918, including a pair of Fokker D.VIIs shared with Donald Hudson, and three other pilots on 2 July.

On 20 July 1918, he was one of three pilots forced down by stormy weather. He was wounded and captured by the Germans. Taken to hospital, he died of his wounds.

Having scored all of his victories in the Nieuport 28, he was one of the most successful pilots in the type, along with Douglas Campbell.

Honors and awards
Distinguished Service Cross (DSC)

The Distinguished Service Cross is presented to John Knox MacArthur, Second Lieutenant (Air Service), U.S. Army, for extraordinary heroism in action near Luneville, France, June 13, 1918. Outnumbered and handicapped by his presence far behind the German lines, Second Lieutenant MacArthur and three flying companions fought brilliantly a large group of enemy planes, bringing down or putting to flight all in the attacking party, while performing an important mission.

Legion d'Honneur

See also

 List of World War I flying aces from the United States

References

Bibliography
 American Aces of World War I. Norman Franks, Harry Dempsey. Osprey Publishing, 2001. , .
 Over The Front: The Complete Record of the Fighter Aces and Units of the United States and French Air Services, 1914-1918 . Norman Franks, Frank Bailey. Grub Street Publishing, 2008.

External links

1891 births
1918 deaths
American World War I flying aces
Aviators from Pennsylvania
Aviators killed in aviation accidents or incidents
People from Columbia, Pennsylvania
Recipients of the Distinguished Service Cross (United States)
American military personnel killed in World War I